Scythris pallidella is a moth of the family Scythrididae. It was described by Passerin d'Entrèves and Roggero in 2006. It is found in Mongolia, Tajikistan and Uzbekistan.

References

pallidella
Moths described in 2006
Moths of Asia